Hebbal Assembly constituency is one of the assembly segments of Karnataka state. It is a part of Bengaluru Urban district and comes under  Bengaluru North parliamentary constituency.

Members of Legislative Assembly

Election results

2018

2016 bypoll

2013

References

 http://www.deccanchronicle.com/current-affairs/270116/hebbal-bypoll-congress-old-guard-turns-tide-for-sharief.html
 http://www.mapsofindia.com/assemblypolls/karnataka/election-results.html

Assembly constituencies of Karnataka
Bangalore Urban district